How to Stop Worrying and Start Living is a self-help book by Dale Carnegie.  It was first printed in Great Britain in 1948 by Richard Clay (The Chaucer Press), Ltd., Bungay Suffolk (S.B.N. 437 95083 2).  It is currently published as a Mass Market Paperback of 352 pages by Pocket (Revised edition: September 15, 1990), .

Carnegie says in the preface to How to Stop Worrying and Start Living that he wrote it because he "was one of the unhappiest lads in New York". He said that he made himself sick with worry because he hated his position in life, which he credits for wanting to figure out how to stop worrying.

The book's goal is to lead the reader to a more enjoyable and fulfilling life, helping them to become more aware of, not only themselves, but others around them. Carnegie tries to address the everyday nuances of living, in order to get the reader to focus on the more important aspects of life. It is now a world-famous, self-help book amongst many people.

External links 
 Summary
 

1948 non-fiction books
Self-help books
Books by Dale Carnegie